IPFilter (commonly referred to as ipf) is an open-source software package that provides firewall services and network address translation (NAT) for many Unix-like operating systems. The author and software maintainer is Darren Reed.  IPFilter supports both IPv4 and IPv6 protocols, and is a stateful firewall.

IPFilter is delivered with FreeBSD, NetBSD, Solaris 10 & 11, illumos, OpenIndiana and HP-UX. It used to be a part of OpenBSD, but it was removed by Theo de Raadt in May 2001 due to problems with its license. It was subsequently replaced in OpenBSD by PF, which was developed by OpenBSD's own developers. DragonFly BSD removed its support for IPFilter in May 2011.

IPFilter can be installed as a runtime-loadable kernel module or directly incorporated into the operating system kernel, depending on the specifics of each kernel and user preferences. The software's documentation recommends the module approach, if possible.

Notes

See also
 ipfw
 iptables
 NPF (firewall)
 PF (firewall)

References

External links
 ipfilter
 The IP Filter FAQ by Phil Dibowitz (2007)

Internet Protocol based network software
Firewall software
BSD software